Yuri Zhevnov (born 17 April 1981) is a professional football coach and a former player from Belarus. He is the goalkeepers' coach with Zenit St. Petersburg.

Career

Zhevnov started his career at third division. In 2000, he was signed by BATE Borisov. During UEFA Cup 2001/02 qualification match against FC Dinamo Tbilisi Zhevnov scored a goal from his own half. In 2005, was signed by FC Moscow. On 23 February 2010 Zenit St. Petersburg signed the Belarus international goalkeeper from FC Moscow on a four-year deal.

International career
Zhevnov is a former Captain of the Belarus national football team and has made over 30 appearances. On 3 September 2010, Zhevnov captained Belarus to a shocking 1-0 victory over France at the Stade de France. "This is definitely one of the biggest wins in our history, but it's going to take a bit of time before we realise what we've done," said Zhevnov. "Victories give you strength and confidence, so we hope to build on this." Belarus have never appeared in a major tournament, and Zhevnov set qualification out of Group D for the UEFA Euro 2012 tournament as the team's primary goalkeeper.

Personal life
He has Belarusian and Russian citizenships.

Career honours
BATE Borisov
Belarusian Premier League champion: 2002

Zenit Saint Petersburg
Russian Premier League champion: 2010, 2011–12
Russian Cup winner: 2009–10
Russian Super Cup winner: 2011

Individual
Belarusian Footballer of the Year: 2010

References

1981 births
Living people
Belarusian footballers
Belarusian expatriate footballers
Belarus international footballers
FC RUOR Minsk players
Belarusian Premier League players
FC BATE Borisov players
FC Moscow players
FC Zenit Saint Petersburg players
FC Torpedo Moscow players
FC Ural Yekaterinburg players
Association football goalkeepers
Expatriate footballers in Russia
Russian Premier League players
Belarusian expatriate sportspeople in Russia